Proteoteras moffatiana, known generally as the gray-flanked proteotera or maple shoot borer, is a species of tortricid moth in the family Tortricidae.

The MONA or Hodges number for Proteoteras moffatiana is 3235.

References

Further reading

External links

 

Eucosmini
Moths described in 1905